The 11th RICOH Cup began on 9 December 2010 and concluded on 24 April 2011. Tan Xiao defeated Li Zhe in the final.

Tournament

Final

References

2011 in go
Go competitions in China